Arbeiter may refer to

Publications:
Arbeiter-Zeitung (disambiguation), several newspapers
Arbeiter-Illustrierte-Zeitung, a German-language magazine published in 1924–1938
Arbeiter Fragen, journal of the Jewish Bundist trade unions active in Poland in the 1920s and 1930s
Arbeiter Ring Publishing, an American book publisher 
Bauer und Arbeiter, a German-language communist newspaper published in Baku in 1924
Banater Arbeiter-Presse, a German-language socialist newspaper published from Romania in 1925–1927
Der jüdische Arbeiter (disambiguation), several periodicals
Freie Arbeiter Stimme, an anarchist periodical in the Yiddish language

People:
Argo Arbeiter (born 1973), Estonian association football player

Other uses:
Arbeiter-Turn- und Sportbund, a German sports organization active in 1893–1933
Ost-Arbeiter, a designation for slave laborers from Central and Eastern Europe in Germany during World War II
Arbeiter at the Gate, a noise-rock album by Steve Lieberman